Boris T. Matić (born 1966) is a Croatian film producer.

Matić is the founder and co-owner of Motovun Film Festival, and the founder and director of Zagreb Film Festival. His film production company, was established in 2001.

Matić is a recipient of two Big Golden Arenas for Best Film, in 1997 (for Mondo Bobo) and 2006 (for All for Free).

Filmography

Producer or co-producer
 Mondo Bobo (1997)
 The One Who Will Stay Unnoticed (2003)
 Sex, Drink and Bloodshed (2004)
 Gravehopping (2005)
 The Border Post (2006)
 All for Free (2006)
 Buick Riviera (2008)
 Donkey (2009)
 The Judgment (2014)
 Life Is a Trumpet (2015)
 Mali (2018)
 Father (2020)

Sources

External links
 

1966 births
Living people
People from Doboj
Croatian film producers
Croats of Bosnia and Herzegovina